Eliah ben Samuel ben Parnes of Stephanow was a Bulgarian Jewish Biblical commentator and poet.

Eliah lived in the second half of the fifteenth century, probably first at Widdin, and later at Constantinople. He maintained a correspondence on scientific subjects with Moses Capsali, Elijah Mizraḥi, and other Talmudical authorities. In 1468 or 1469, he wrote a grammatical and allegorical commentary on the Pentateuch, entitled Sefer ha-Zikkaron ('The Book of Memory'). The commentary is followed by poetical pieces composed by the author, twelve of which are liturgical poems.

References
 

Date of birth unknown
Date of death unknown
15th-century Jewish biblical scholars
15th-century poets from the Ottoman Empire
15th-century Bulgarian people
Hebrew-language poets
Bible commentators
Bulgarian Jews
Bulgarian male poets
Medieval Jewish poets